Jupiler League may refer to:
 Eerste Divisie, 2nd-highest association football league in the Netherlands; called Jupiler League since 2006
 Belgian First Division A, the highest association football league in Belgium; called Jupiler League 1993–2008 and Jupiler Pro League 2008–present

See also
 Jupiler, Belgian beer with naming rights to the above leagues